Abdulmambetovo (Äbdelmämbät) is a rural locality (a village) in Khalilovsky Selsoviet of Abzelilovsky District, Bashkortostan, Russia. The population was 576 as of 2010. There are 7 streets.

Geography 
Abdulmambetovo is located 31 km south of Askarovo (the district's administrative centre) by road. Makhmutovo is the nearest rural locality.

Ethnicity 
The village is inhabited by Bashkirs.

References 

Rural localities in Abzelilovsky District